Dennis Lester Freeman (March 22, 1939 – May 31, 2020) was an American politician who served as a member of the Iowa House of Representatives for six years, from 1969 to 1975.

Early life and career 
Freeman was born in Paton, Iowa. He worked in the insurance industry. He served in the Iowa House of Representatives from 1969 to 1975 as a Republican.

Personal life 
Freeman attended Gustavus Adolphus College and graduated with a Bachelor of Science in 1961. He married Mary Lou Hawkinson the following year on June 10, 1962, and together they had four children.

Death 
He died at age 81 on May 31, 2020, in Stratford, Iowa, due to complications of Parkinson’s disease.

References 

1939 births
2020 deaths
People from Greene County, Iowa
Businesspeople from Iowa
Republican Party members of the Iowa House of Representatives